Devayani (born 22 June 1974) is an Indian actress who predominantly appears in Tamil, Malayalam and Telugu-language films.

She started her career with Malayalam and Bengali films 
She received the Tamil Nadu State Film Award for Best Actress for her performances in the films Surya Vamsam (1997) and Bharathi (2000) and a Special Award for Kadhal Kottai (1996).

She was a part of several successful films, including Ninaithen Vandhai (1998), Nee Varuvai Ena (1999),  Thenali (2000), Friends (2001), Aanandham (2001) and Azhagi (2002) as well as in the Sun TV's huge successful serial Kolangal.

Personal life
Devayani was born on 22 June 1974 in Mumbai, Maharashtra to a Konkani father from Mangalore,Karnataka and a Malayali mother from Kerala. She has two younger brothers Nakkhul and Mayur. The former is working as an actor and singer in the Tamil film industry, while the latter would also make his acting debut in an upcoming film.

She dated director Rajakumaran, with whom she had worked on a few films for several years. Both their parents did not approve of their relationship, which led the couple to elope, and marry privately on 9 April 2001. They have two daughters, Iniya and Priyanka.

Career
Devayani began her career as Koyal in the Hindi film Koyal, which was later cancelled during its production stage. She appeared in a Bengali film, Shaat Ponchomi. She also acted in a Marathi film before debuting in the South with lead roles in Malayalam films. Kinnaripuzhayoram is the first film in Malayalam. Next year she did Tamil and Telugu film also. She started as a glam doll, she has done item number in a Tamil movie called Sivashakthi. Her earliest films were released in the early and middle 90's including Kadhal Kottai.

Devayani began acting in the teleserial Kolangal as Abinaya, for 1,533 episodes on Sun TV.  Kolangal made her one of the most successful personalities in Tamil television industry. It was later dubbed into Malayalam also in the same name on Surya TV. She has completed a Teacher Training course and is now a teacher at Church Park Convent, Chennai. Currently, she is judging a popular reality show on Mazhavil Manorama titled Ugram Ujwalam. She has acted in some advertisements also. She is now acting in Pudhu Pudhu Arthangal, a Tamil serial of Zee Tamil in which she again paired with his Kolangal pair which is a her big comeback to Television.

Filmography

Television

Serials

Shows

Awards and honours

References

External links 
 

Actresses in Malayalam television
Actresses in Tamil cinema
Living people
Konkani people
University of Mumbai alumni
Actresses in Telugu cinema
1973 births
Actresses in Malayalam cinema
Tamil Nadu State Film Awards winners
International Tamil Film Award winners
Actresses from Mumbai
Actresses in Tamil television
Indian television actresses
20th-century Indian actresses
21st-century Indian actresses
Actresses in Hindi cinema
Actresses in Bengali cinema
Actresses in Kannada cinema